Geech Yarborough was an American baseball catcher and pitcher in the Negro leagues. He played with the Atlanta Black Crackers in 1932 and the Newark Eagles in 1940.

References

External links
 and Seamheads

Atlanta Black Crackers players
Newark Eagles players
Year of birth missing
Year of death missing
Baseball pitchers
Baseball catchers